Cao Qi (born January 15, 1974) is a retired female Chinese discus thrower. Her personal best throw was 66.08 metres, achieved in September 1993 in Beijing. The Chinese and Asian record is currently held by Xiao Yanling with 71.68 metres.

She won the 1993 Asian Championships and won the silver medal at the 2000 Asian Championships. She also competed at the 1999 World Championships and the 2000 Summer Olympics without reaching the final.

Achievements

References

1974 births
Living people
Athletes (track and field) at the 2000 Summer Olympics
Chinese female discus throwers
Olympic athletes of China
Competitors at the 1998 Goodwill Games
20th-century Chinese women